Riaz Pathan (ṛiyās ěṃ.ṛṛi) (born 6 May 1973), credited mononymously as Riaz M T, is an Indian actor, story writer, and lyricist best known for his work in Malayalam films. He has also acted in Flat No.4B, Onnum Onnum Moonu, Dust Bin, Deadline, Mughapadangal, Clint, Kayamkulam Kochunni, Kannada Movie Gadiyara films.

Riaz Pathan made his debut in Malayalam movie of Krishnjith S Vijayan's Flat No.4B in 2013 and Kannada Movie of Prabhiq Mogavear's Gadiyara in 2020. Riaz won Adoor Bhasi Best Actor Award in 2014 for his lead role in his first movie Flat No.4B Movie.

Early life 
Riaz M T was born in Alappuzha to P V Thajudeen and Nazeema H B. His initial schooling was at Polabhagam J B School West of Mannath Jn, Poonthopu Ward, Alappuzha and he done his high school at S D V Boys High School Alappuzha and done pre-degree and degree in S D College, Alappuzha.

Career

Malayalam cinema

Riaz made his debut in Krishnjith S Vijayan's [Flat No.4B] in 2012. 

Riaz's Second Movie released was Onnum Onnum Moonu, released in 2015.

Filmography

As actor

As a story writer

As a director

As a lyricist
Riaz M T debuted as a Lyricist in Flat No.4B (2013) by writing the song of the film, "Iniyumeerananiyumo".

UAE National Day Album 2018

Riaz M T done a main role in UAE National Day Album 2018

As a model

References

External links
 
 

Indian male film actors
Living people
Male actors from Alappuzha
Male actors in Malayalam cinema
1973 births